Thomas Laurent (born 5 April 1998) is a French racing driver who currently competes in the FIA World Endurance Championship for French team Signatech Alpine Matmut and in the European Le Mans Series with Graff Racing. He finished second in the 2017 24 Hours of Le Mans and third in the 2018 24 Hours of Le Mans.

Career

Early life 
Born in La Roche-sur-Yon to go-kart racing mechanic Jean-Pascal Laurent and his wife Nathalie Laurent, he began karting at age three in a small custom-built go kart on an adapted circuit constructed by his father and began competing competitively from the age of seven. He aimed to be in endurance racing from the age of either 11 or 12 and was an enthusiast of the 24 Hours of Le Mans. Laurent finished ninth at the 2012 World Karting Championship held in Portimão, Portugal. He won the French Karting Championship every year from 2012 to 2014 and the World Karting Championship in 2015.

2015 
He stepped out of karting aged 17 in late 2015 and had twice tested a Formula 4 car but he was unhappy with the amount of money he required to progress to the category. He competed in 3 of the 4 rounds 2015–16 Asian Le Mans Series with Jackie Chan DC Racing alongside Ho-Pin Tung and David Cheng. They won all three races, but Laurent was only ranked second in the championship as Tung and Cheng won the opening round without him, leaving Laurent with a 25-point deficit.

2016 
Laurent raced in the 2016 European Le Mans Championship in LMP3 for YMR in a Ligier JS P3 alongside Alexandre Cougnaud and Yann Ehrlacher. He finished 8th in the championship despite three retirements, and took a dominant win in the final round at Estoril. He also entered the Road To Le Mans race that year for DC Racing, alongside Cougnaud. Laurent took over the car in the lead and pulled away to win the race.

Laurent returned to the Asian Le Mans Series for the 2016–17 season. He raced in LMP2, again for DC Racing alongside Tung and Gustavo Menezes. He missed the first round (which Tung and Menezes won in his absence) before they came second and first at Fuji and Buriram respectively. This left the No. 35 car with an 18-point lead coming into the final round. However they retired after a first corner accident, and lost the title. Laurent placed seventh in the drivers title.

2017 

In 2017 it was announced that Laurent would race in the World Endurance Championship in the LMP2 class. He drove for Jackie Chan DC Racing in a Jota Sport run Oreca 07 alongside Tung and Oliver Jarvis.

After winning on his debut at Silverstone and finishing third at Spa, Laurent had an impressive run at Le Mans. After helping his team get into the LMP2 lead, Laurent inherited the overall lead due to problems with LMP1 cars. In the end he won Le Mans in the LMP2 class, finishing second on the overall podium. He added to his win count with a dominant victory at the Nurburgring, but then finished ninth in class in Mexico due to a clutch issue. More successful races followed at the Circuit Of The Americas and Fuji with fourth and third-placed finishes respectively.

It was announced that Laurent was awarded an opportunity to drive a Toyota LMP1 car in the Bahrain post-season test.

2018
Laurent has a contract dispute with DC Racing, because he signed with Rebellion Racing. Despite this he with Harrison Newey and Stéphane Richelmi took the 2017–18 Asian Le Mans Series title in the LMP2 category. He got a green light to race for Rebellion in 2018–19 FIA World Endurance Championship, competing behind the wheel of Rebellion R13 car with Mathias Beche and Gustavo Menezes. He finished his first LMP1 race on podium behind two hybrid Toyotas. He joined the Signatech Alpine team the following season, finishing 8th in the standings with two podiums. In November 2018, Laurent tested a Dallara F2 2018 car for Arden International at the FIA Formula 2 Championship post-season rookie test session at the Yas Marina Circuit.

Racing record

Career summary

† As Laurent was a guest driver, he was ineligible to score points.

Complete European Le Mans Series results

Complete FIA World Endurance Championship results

Complete 24 Hours of Le Mans results

References

External links 

1998 births
Living people
People from La Roche-sur-Yon
French racing drivers
Porsche Supercup drivers
European Le Mans Series drivers
Asian Le Mans Series drivers
24 Hours of Le Mans drivers
FIA World Endurance Championship drivers
Sportspeople from Vendée
Karting World Championship drivers
Rebellion Racing drivers
Signature Team drivers
Jota Sport drivers
Graff Racing drivers
Le Mans Cup drivers